The 2012 AAA 400 was a NASCAR Cup Series stock car race held on September 30, 2012 at Dover International Speedway in Dover, Delaware. Contested over 400 laps, it was the twenty-ninth in the 2012 NASCAR Sprint Cup Series, as well as the third race in the ten-race Chase for the Sprint Cup, which ends the season.

Standings after the race

Note: Only the first twelve positions are included for the driver standings.

References 

NASCAR races at Dover Motor Speedway
AAA 400
AAA 400
AAA 400